The Fujifilm GFX100 is a mirrorless medium format camera produced by Fujifilm. It is the flagship model of the GFX Series of mirrorless digital cameras and the third camera with the Fujifilm G-mount. The camera comes in two versions, the regular GFX100 and the GFX100 IR.

The GFX100 did win :ja:カメラグランプリ 2020 Editors Award.

The GFX100 IR is the latest release of the series.

GFX100 

On September 25, 2018, the GFX 100Megapixels Concept was unveiled at Photokina 2018. The camera was launched on May 23, 2019, for release in late June 2019.

The camera has a back-illuminated sensor with phase detection pixels. The sensor is 1.7 times the size of a 35 mm full-frame sensor. The camera uses the in-body image stabilization (IBIS) mechanism with 5-axis stabilization, and has 4K/30P video recording capability using the full sensor without cropping. It has twin battery packs, dual SD slots, twin status LCDs, a tri-axial 3.2" monitor, USB charging and power delivery over USB C and a removable electronic viewfinder with a 5.76 million dot OLED panel and 0.86× magnification.

GFX100 IR 

On November 25, 2020, Fujifilm launched a special edition of the camera called GFX100 IR.

The camera is primarily used for infrared image capturing up to 400MP resolution of images, courtesy of a new 'Pixel Shift Combiner' feature. 

The camera however, is not for general photographers. It is designed for forensic, scientific, and cultural preservation applications, and therefore, will not be available to consumers for personal use. The new camera will start selling on a special order in 2021.

See also 
 Fujifilm GFX100S
 Fujifilm G-mount

References

External links 

 Fujifilm Global GFX100 Product Page
 Fujifilm GFX Products official site

Fujifilm G-mount cameras
Cameras introduced in 2019